Udayapur is a Village Development Committee in Banke District in Lumbini Province of south-western Nepal. At the time of the 1991 Nepal census it had a population of 2,301 and had 397 houses in the village. Two government owned primary schools are situated here along with one among 10 Health Posts in district and a police station. Now, it is a part of Nepalgunj sub-metropolitan city.

References

Populated places in Banke District